Christian Academy of Knoxville (CAK) is a private, non-denominational Christian school located in Knoxville, Tennessee.

Athletics
The Warriors compete in TSSAA class A-AA athletics, and class 3A football. Athletic programs include football, basketball, soccer, baseball, softball, volleyball,  tennis, golf, swimming, cross country, wrestling, and track & field. 
Varsity Warriors sports teams have won nine state titles in men's soccer and four in women's soccer since 2003.  
The Warriors won the Class 3A football State Championship in 2011 and 2012.
The Warriors have also won state titles in golf (both team and individual), tennis (both men's and women's), cross country, numerous track events, baseball and wrestling (Ryan Long 2x state champion).

References

External links
 Christian Academy of Knoxville

Christian schools in Tennessee
Private K-12 schools in Tennessee
Schools in Knoxville, Tennessee
Preparatory schools in Tennessee
Nondenominational Christian schools in the United States
1977 establishments in Tennessee
Educational institutions established in 1977